Sensual Jungle is a 1969 Argentine film directed by Leo Fleider.

Cast

External links
 

1969 films
Argentine drama films
1960s Spanish-language films
1960s Argentine films
Films directed by Leo Fleider